Reymond Louis Fuentes (born February 12, 1991) is a Puerto Rican professional baseball outfielder who is a free agent. He has played in Major League Baseball (MLB) for the San Diego Padres, Kansas City Royals and Arizona Diamondbacks.

Early life
Fuentes attended Fernando Callejo High School in Manatí, Puerto Rico where he was a sprint champion.

Professional career

Boston Red Sox
Fuentes was drafted by the Boston Red Sox in the first round of the 2009 MLB Draft. He was the 28th overall pick of the draft, and was given a $1,134,000 signing bonus.

San Diego Padres
On December 6, 2010, he was traded to the San Diego Padres along with Anthony Rizzo, Casey Kelly, and Eric Patterson for first baseman Adrián González. Fuentes was ranked between the sixth and tenth best prospect in the Red Sox organization.

Fuentes spent 2011 with the High-A Lake Elsinore Storm where he hit .275 in 510 at-bats and stole 41 bases.  In 2012, he played 134 games in center field with the Double-A San Antonio Missions where his average dropped to .218 in 473 at-bats.  Fuentes again opened 2013 with the Missions and raised his average to .316 with 6 home runs and 29 stolen bases in 93 games, spending time at all 3 outfield positions.  He was promoted to the Triple-A Tucson Padres on August 10 where he collected 23 hits in 14 games before his Major League call-up.

Fuentes played for the World Team in the 2013 All-Star Futures Game.

Fuentes was called up to the Major Leagues from Triple-A on August 26, 2013, and started in center field that night.  He remained with the team for the remainder of the year, making six more starts in center and appearing in a total of 23 games.  He collected 5 hits in 33 at-bats and also had 3 stolen bases.

Kansas City Royals
On November 20, 2014 Fuentes was traded to the Kansas City Royals for Kyle Bartsch. After a Spring Training in which he hit .386, Fuentes was selected to be the Royals' Opening Day right fielder to start off the 2016 season, winning the spot over Jarrod Dyson and Paulo Orlando. Despite hitting .317 as a Royal, he was sent down to Triple-A Omaha and released after clearing waivers on September 14, 2016.

Arizona Diamondbacks
In December 2016, Fuentes signed a minor league contract with the Arizona Diamondbacks.  He was called up to the Diamondbacks on May 16, 2017 and was inserted into the starting line-up the same day. He hit his first MLB home run on June 18, 2017, in the 10th inning of a tie game with the Philadelphia Phillies against Jeanmar Gómez; the Diamondbacks won 5–4. He was designated for assignment on January 31, 2018, and cleared waivers on February 5. He elected free agency on November 3, 2018.

Long Island Ducks
On April 4, 2019, Fuentes signed with the Long Island Ducks of the Atlantic League of Professional Baseball. He became a free agent following the season in 100 games he slashed .258/.340/.429 with 14 home runs and 47 RBIs. Fuentes did not play in a game in 2020.

After the 2020 season, he played for Criollos de Caguas of the Liga de Béisbol Profesional Roberto Clemente(LBPRC). He has also played for Puerto Rico in the 2021 Caribbean Series.

On May 26, 2021, Fuentes re-signed with the Ducks for the upcoming season. He became a free agent following the season in 22 games he slashed .222/.355/.349 with 2 home runs and 11 RBIs.

International career
Fuentes played for the Puerto Rico national baseball team at the 2011 Baseball World Cup, 2011 Pan American Games and 2017 World Baseball Classic.

In 2017 World Baseball Classic, he played center field defensively and batted ninth.

Personal life
Fuentes is the cousin of right-fielder Carlos Beltrán.

References

External links

 

1991 births
Living people
American people of Puerto Rican descent
Arizona Diamondbacks players
Arizona League Royals players
Baseball players at the 2011 Pan American Games
Cangrejeros de Santurce (baseball) players
Criollos de Caguas players
El Paso Chihuahuas players
Gigantes de Carolina players
Greenville Drive players
Gulf Coast Red Sox players
Kansas City Royals players
Lake Elsinore Storm players
Leones de Ponce players
Liga de Béisbol Profesional Roberto Clemente outfielders
Long Island Ducks players
Major League Baseball center fielders
National baseball team players
Omaha Storm Chasers players
Pan American Games competitors for Puerto Rico
Reno Aces players
San Antonio Missions players
San Diego Padres players
Tiburones de Aguadilla players
Tucson Padres players
2017 World Baseball Classic players
Baseball players from Orlando, Florida